Joe Walters (born November 30, 1984) is an American former professional lacrosse player.

Walters is part of the 2022 class of the Rochester Lacrosse Hall of Fame.

Early life 
Walters, the youngest of four children was born to Joe and Be Walters. His father, Joe, served with the U.S. Army in the Vietnam War. Walter's father met Be in Vietnam. Walters attended Irondequoit High School in his hometown of Irondequoit, New York.

College career
Walters was a four-time All-American at the University of Maryland. He won the ACC Rookie of the Year Award in 2003, and was named ACC Player of the Year in 2004.
In the last game of his senior regular season with the Terps, Walters became the University of Maryland's all-time leading point scorer with 227 and all-time leading goal scorer with 153. Walters won the 2006 Jack Turnbull Award as the Attackman of the Year. He was also a finalist for the Tewaaraton Trophy, given to the National Player of the Year. Walters played in the 2006 World Lacrosse Championship for Team USA in July 2006. Up to that point, he was the only current college lacrosse player who made Team USA. Since then, Duke's Ned Crotty has also played for Team USA.

Career highlights
Goals: 6 vs. Virginia (2004-04-25), vs. UMBC (2005-03-19), at Johns Hopkins (2006-04-15)Assists:5 vs. Denver (2006-05-13)Points: 8 at Johns Hopkins (2006-04-15)Groundballs:  6 vs. Bucknell (2004-03-17)Multi-Goal Games: 41Multi-Point Games: 52Hat Tricks: 32Point Scoring Streak: 45 games (2004-04-28 to 2006-04-30)Goal Scoring Streak: 27 games (2004-02-28 to 2005-04-29)

Professional career

Major League Lacrosse
Walters was taken 1st overall in the 2006 Major League Lacrosse Collegiate Draft by the Rochester Rattlers.  During the 2007 season, Walters began playing the midfield position for the Rattlers, as opposed to his usual attack position. Walters was a member of consecutive Steinfeld Cup winning teams with the 2008 Rochester Rattlers and the 2009 Toronto Nationals. He was named Most Valuable Player of the 2008 MLL Championship Weekend. With the suspension of operations of the Hamilton Nationals after the 2013 season and the birth of the expansion Florida Launch for the 2014 season, most of the Nationals players, including Walters, were transferred to the Launch. This eliminated the need for MLL to conduct both a dispersal draft and an expansion draft. Before playing a game for the Launch, Walter was traded along with the 21st overall selection in the 2014 MLL collegiate draft to the Chesapeake Bayhawks in exchange for Casey Powell, the 10th selection in the 2014 MLL collegiate draft and the eighth pick in the 2014 MLL supplemental draft. On November 23, 2016 Joe engaged in the new MLL Player Movement Policy and signed with the New York Lizards.

National Lacrosse League
Walters was drafted into the National Lacrosse League by the Buffalo Bandits in the second round of the 2007 Draft.  Walters did not play for the Bandits in 2007.  Later, Walters was traded to the Philadelphia Wings, but never joined the team. Walters played his first season in the NLL with the Rochester Knighthawks in 2009. Walters was a member of the 2012, 2013 and 2014 Champion's Cup winning teams with the Knighthawks.

Canadian Lacrosse Association
Walters was a member of the 2011 Mann Cup champion Brampton Excelsiors.

Premier Lacrosse League
In 2019, Walters was announced as a member of Redwoods Lacrosse Club in Paul Rabil’s new Premier Lacrosse League.

Walters announced his retirement in March of 2022.

Personal 
Walters is of Vietnamese descent from his mother, who was born in Vietnam.

Statistics

NCAA

Major League Lacrosse
Reference:

Premier Lacrosse League

National Lacrosse League
Reference:

Canadian Lacrosse Association
Reference:

Awards

References

External links
 The official site of Joe Walters jw1lacrosse.com

1984 births
Living people
American lacrosse players
Chesapeake Bayhawks players
Hamilton Nationals players
Maryland Terrapins men's lacrosse players
New York Lizards players
Premier Lacrosse League players
Rochester Knighthawks players
Rochester Rattlers players
San Diego Seals players